Biarmosuchoides is a genus of a therapsid found in Dubovka I in Orenburg Oblast (Russia). It is known only from SGU 104B/2051, a left dentary. It was originally classified as a biarmosuchian, but Suchkova, Golubev & Shumov (2022) subsequently reinterpreted it as a therocephalian belonging to the family Scylacosauridae.

References

Biarmosuchians
Prehistoric therapsid genera
Guadalupian synapsids of Europe
Fossil taxa described in 1994